Cities in Vietnam are identified by the government as settlements with considerable area and population that play important roles vis-a-vis politics, economy and culture. Status of cities falls into four categories: special, first class (I), second class (II), and third class (III).

Municipalities

Centrally controlled cities (thành phố trực thuộc trung ương) or municipalities are cities with significant importance in terms of politics, economy and culture of Vietnam that are under direct control of the Vietnamese government. There are currently five centrally controlled municipalities.

Municipal cities 

Municipal cities (subcities) in Vietnam are placed under the municipality's government.

Provincial cities 

Provincial cities in Vietnam are placed under the province's government.

Gallery

See also
Provinces of Vietnam
Provincial city (Vietnam)
District-level town (Vietnam)

References

External links

 
Vietnam, List of cities in
Cities
Vietnam